Demand deposits or checkbook money are funds held in demand accounts in commercial banks. These account balances are usually considered money and form the greater part of the narrowly defined money supply of a country. Simply put, these are deposits in the bank that can be withdrawn on demand, without any prior notice.

History

In the United States, demand deposits arose following the 1865 tax of 10% on the issuance of state bank notes; see history of banking in the USA.

In the U.S., demand deposits only refer to funds held in checking accounts (or cheque offering accounts) other than NOW accounts; however, in a 1970s and 1980s response to the 1933 promulgation of Regulation Q in the U.S., demand deposits in some cases came to allow easier access to funds from other types of accounts (e.g. savings accounts and money market accounts). For the historical basis of the distinction between demand deposits and NOW accounts in the U.S., see Negotiable order of withdrawal account#History.

Money supply
Demand deposits are usually considered part of the narrowly defined money supply, as they can be used, via checks and drafts, as a means of payment for goods and services and to settle debts. The money supply of a country is usually defined to consist of currency plus demand deposits. In most countries, demand deposits account for a majority of the money supply.

During times of financial crisis, bank customers will withdraw their funds in cash, leading to a drop in demand deposits and a shrinking of the money supply. Economists have speculated that this effect contributed to the severity of the Great Depression.

This did not happen, however, in the financial crisis that began in 2008. In fact, demand deposits in the U.S. increased dramatically, from around $310bn in August 2008 to a peak of around $460bn in December 2008.

See also

 Liquidity

References

Bank deposits
Monetary reform

cs:Vklad#Vklad na požádání a termínovaný vklad